Matahi is a rural valley in the Whakatāne District and Bay of Plenty Region of New Zealand's North Island.

History and culture

20th century

Rua Kenana Hepetipa, a Māori prophet, faith healer and land rights activist, established the settlement in 1910. He had established the settlement of Maungapohatu three years earlier.

For several years, Rua lived between Matahi, with his youngest wife Te Atawhai Tara or Piimia, and Maungapohatu, with his first wife Pinepine Te Rika. From 1912, Matahi went through a period of growth, while Maungapohatu went through decline. Rua spent an increasing amount of time in Matahi, and was there when he died in 1937.

During the 1918 flu pandemic, the area did not have the high mortality rate of other parts of eastern Bay of Plenty.

The Matahi Bridge was destroyed and the area was cut off by landslips during severe flooding in March 1964. One of Rua's grandsons had to be rescued by helicopter after being badly injured in the severe weather.

By 1986, some descendants and followers of Rua returned to Matahi with young families to live closer to their marae and a traditional way of life.

21st century

In 2010, Bay of Plenty man Pomare Mason was killed by his younger brother Whairiri Tamataonui Terewa in the valley, during an argument about the ownership of a home.

The valley was cut off, and Matahi Valley Road was closed, due to flooding and slips in April 2014. The valley was also affected by flooding in March and April 2017.

In July 2016 a mother and four children went missing in Te Urewera protected area, and Lions Hut on Matahi Valley Road became the base for the search operation. Relatives searched the area on their own, against official advice, and found the group about 30 minutes' from the valley road.

Marae

The valley is the rohe (tribal area) of the Tuhoe people. It has several marae.

Matahi Marae and Te Huinga ō te Kura house is affiliated with Ngāi Tamatuhirae and was established in 1925. In October 2020, the Government committed $508,757 from the Provincial Growth Fund to upgrade Tataiāhape Marae, Piripari Marae, Matahi Marae and Tanatana Marae, creating 9.8 jobs.

Omuriwaka Marae and Te Tātua o Hape ki Tūārangi house is affiliated with Ngāi Tamatuhirae.

Tuapo Marae and Te Ao Hou house is affiliated with Tamakaimoana.

Whakarae Marae and Toi te Huatahi house is affiliated with Whakatāne Hapū and Ngāi Tama and was established in 1930.

Education

References

Whakatane District
Populated places in the Bay of Plenty Region